Rosemary Hall is a Greek Revival house in North Augusta, South Carolina that was built in 1900. It was listed on the National Register of Historic Places in 1978. Today, it serves as a boutique bed-and-breakfast.

References

Houses on the National Register of Historic Places in South Carolina
Houses completed in 1900
National Register of Historic Places in Aiken County, South Carolina
Houses in Aiken County, South Carolina
North Augusta, South Carolina